Matt DePeters (born August 20, 1987) is an American freestyle skier who has competed since 2006. His best World Cup finish was 15th in an aerials event at Deer Valley, Utah in January 2010.  He grew up skiing for the Buffalo Ski Club Freestyle Team.

DePeters was named to the United States team for the 2010 Winter Olympics in January 2010.

References

1987 births
American female freestyle skiers
Freestyle skiers at the 2010 Winter Olympics
Living people
Olympic freestyle skiers of the United States
Place of birth missing (living people)